Joseph Claude Sinel  (27 September 1889 – 27 January 1975) also known as Jo Sinel or "Auckland Jo", was a pioneering New-Zealand-born American industrial designer. Referred to in his lifetime and since as the father of American industrial design, he established what many regarded as the country's first industrial design practice.

Early life and education
Sinel was born in Auckland, New Zealand, son of Thomas Edwin Sinel (1861–1928) and Eliza Janice Motion (1856–1926); one of some eleven siblings. His father, born at Saint Helier, Jersey, was then working as Tally Clerk at Queen Street wharf, progressing to prominence on the waterfront as the representative of various overseas shipping companies.

Sinel once said it was Thomas Umfrey Wells, headmaster of Richmond Road School and exceptional educator, who advised him to become an "artist". After leaving school, in about 1904 he set out on that path with work in the art department of Wilson & Horton, lithographers and publishers of The New Zealand Herald, for some five years, as well as training through the art and design course at Auckland Technical College. There, without any definite thoughts on design at that point, he studied under the British industrial artist, Harry Wallace, who'd emigrated from England to take up appointment as an instructor at the college in 1904. Wallace had designed mass-production pottery, worked on staff at the Wedgwood Institute, Staffordshire, and exhibited at the Royal Academy of Arts. At college, examinations in science and art were carried out in connection with the Board of Education, South Kensington, London, (South Kensington system)  through which Sinel gained first-class passes in drawing in 1908 and 1909, and in design in 1910. It is also commonly understood that he attended Elam School of Art.

Career
After Wilson & Horton, Sinel freelanced in Wellington and Christchurch, then upon returning to Auckland, established a "commercial art and design" practice in Shortland Street. A split in the Auckland Society of Arts at the September 1911 meeting induced a few members, including Sinel, to resign and form the new Auckland Arts and Crafts Club in May 1912, where he exhibited work at their first annual exhibition held at the Auckland Society of Arts' gallery that year. A surviving presentation drawing depicting his design for a hand-cranked Auckland street directory is thought to be from this period.

Travels
Sinel appears to have left Auckland on the SS Maheno for Sydney, Australia, in January 1914, where he took to a life of subsistence as a sheep shearer, harvest-hand and rabbitter. Soon after the outbreak of the Great War, he left Australia for Britain, from Sydney employed as a trimmer on the SS Rimutaka on 5 January 1915, to Liverpool on 8 March 1915. Walking through England and Scotland, he worked as a designer of printed tin box forms for Hudson Scott & Sons of Carlisle, and as a commercial artist for the highly regarded London commercial artists and advertising agencies, Carlton Studios and Charles F. Higham Limited. Higham's clients included Goodrich Tires, His Master's Voice and the British government. Though six of his brothers had enlisted in the Samoa Expeditionary Force and New Zealand Expeditionary Force, Wilfred Sinel  attaining the rank of Lieutenant Colonel, his own attempt to enlist in Kitchener's Army was unsuccessful. Instead, he served part of the war as an able seaman in the British Mercantile Marine.

Back in New Zealand and Australia, Sinel worked as an art director and commercial artist mostly on campaigns promoting American products until, on 24 August 1918, he shipped out of Sydney on RMS Niagara for Vancouver, touched at Seattle and, amidst the Spanish influenza pandemic and its precautions, entered the United States at San Francisco. He'd visited San Francisco before.

United States
Harold von Schmidt took him on staff at the advertising firm of Foster & Kleiser, creating posters and billboard advertising then booming to fill any vacant space in town, and working alongside the notable artists and designers von Schmidt, Maynard Dixon, Maurice Del Mue, Roi Partridge, Charles Stafford Duncan, Judson Starr and Otis Shepard.
When von Schmidt left Foster & Kleiser, Sinel left too, and along with Maynard Dixon, David Hendrickson, Judson Starr, set up Advertising Illustrators, an independent group producing art for the various San Francisco advertising agencies, including Foster and Kleiser. The group did well for four years.

At some point, Sinel, along with Del Mue, took time-out to explore the Sierra Nevada mountains, where he built a log cabin at Susie Lake, then, as winter closed in, returned to San Francisco and several job offers. 

In 1919 he was appointed as head of the art department at First National Pictures in New York. With the firm's publicity department in mid-June 1920, and having fitted out an automobile painted with graphics advertising the company's movies on the sides, he and Matthew Singer set off on a tour for a greater part of the year, traveling across the United States from Broadway and 42nd Street to the Truckee woodlands, California, promoting, in a semi-official capacity, the firm's sub-franchising plan.

Returned to San Francisco he was employed on lettering by the advertising agency H.K. McCann Company, taught design and lettering at the California School of Arts and Crafts for Frederick Meyer in 1921–1922, produced book illustrations and designs for the San Francisco publishers Edwin and Robert Grabhorn, the Grabhorn Press, established in 1920,
 then, for some five weeks, was an art director for Charles Corbett Ronalds, who'd established Ronalds Press and Advertising Agency Limited in Montreal, Canada, in 1918–19.

Sinel moved on to New York City in about 1923, where he started his own industrial design company. In 1936, he returned to the San Francisco Bay Area where he taught industrial design at the Rudolph Schaeffer School of Design.

Sinel claimed to have designed everything from "ads to andirons and automobiles, from beer bottles to book covers, from hammers to hearing aids, from labels and letterheads to packages and pickle jars, from textiles and telephone books to toasters, typewriters and trucks." Although he is perhaps best remembered for his designs of industrial scales, typewriters, and calculators, he also designed trademarks for businesses such as the Art Institute of Chicago, created book jackets for Doubleday, Knopf, and Random House, and for many years designed publications for Mills College. He taught design in a number of schools in the United States, and in 1955 became one of the fourteen founders of the American Society of Industrial Designers (which later merged with other organizations to form the Industrial Designers Society of America).

Sinel is sometimes said to have coined the term "industrial design" around the 1920s in the USA, though he first applied it there in relation to his professional work in 1919. Sinel denied the paternity of this term in an interview in 1969.

"... that's the same time [1920] that I was injecting myself into the industrial design field, of which it's claimed (and I'm in several of the books where they claim) that I was the first one, and they even say that I invented the name. I'm sure I didn't do that. I don't know where it originated and I don't know where I got hold of it."

The term was in use in by engineers, designers and artists in industrial nations in the 1840s. Florence Elizabeth Cory had founded the Original School of Industrial Design for Women in New York City in 1881. In 1891, American industrial designers were amongst others petitioning Secretary of the Treasury Foster to remove an embargo on foreign art, photographic and musical publications. The US Patent Office's first use of the term "industrial designer" appeared in 1913 as a synonym for "art in industry."

Gallery

Publications

Bibliography

References

External links
 IDSA: Joseph Claude Sinel, FIDSA
 CCA Libraries: Joseph C. Sinel Collection
 The Doctor Leslie Project: PM / A-D, Designers & Artists Contributors, 1934-1942
 NZEDGE.COM: Joseph Sinel
 FamilySearch
 A book of American trade-marks & devices - at the Internet Archive

1889 births
1975 deaths
People associated with the Auckland Society of Arts
New Zealand graphic designers
Industrial designers
New Zealand industrial designers
American industrial designers
Fellows of the Industrial Designers Society of America
Art Deco designers
Modernist designers
Logo designers
Exhibition designers
New Zealand emigrants to the United States